Dušan Šimić (born July 22, 1980) is a Serbian footballer. He also holds Slovenian nationality.

Career
Šimić started playing at Šumadija 1903 in Serbia and Montenegro, followed by a period of playing for OFK Beograd before joining Ukraine's Premier League team Karpaty Lviv, in the winter of 2001/2002. He made his debut for Karpaty on 21 April 2002 in a match won 1–0 against Vorskla Poltava. He scored his first goal for Karpaty on 12 July 2002 in the 2nd round match against Metalurh Zaporizhya won 1–0. For the 2003 season he was loaned out by Karpaty to South Korea's K-League team Busan I'cons, where he made 35 appearances. He returned from the loan in February 2004, but he transferred to Hungarian First Division team Békéscsaba Előre. In the first half of the 2006/2007 season Šimić played for Ceahlăul Piatra Neamţ in the Romanian First Division, and after the winter break, in the second half of the season for FC Brașov in Second Division. In 2007, he was registered at the Serbian Second Division team Vlasina, that was to end the season 16th and be relegated to Serbian League East.

References

External links

1980 births
Living people
Serbian footballers
Serbia and Montenegro footballers
Association football midfielders
Serbian expatriate footballers
FK Radnički 1923 players
OFK Beograd players
Expatriate footballers in Ukraine
FC Karpaty Lviv players
Busan IPark players
Expatriate footballers in South Korea
Serbian expatriate sportspeople in South Korea
K League 1 players
Liga I players
Ukrainian Premier League players
Expatriate footballers in Romania
CSM Ceahlăul Piatra Neamț players
FC Brașov (1936) players